James Joseph Sylvester  (3 September 1814 – 15 March 1897) was an English mathematician. He made fundamental contributions to matrix theory, invariant theory, number theory, partition theory, and combinatorics.  He played a leadership role in American mathematics in the later half of the 19th century as a professor at the Johns Hopkins University and as founder of the American Journal of Mathematics.  At his death, he was a professor at Oxford University.

Biography 
James Joseph was born in London on 3 September 1814, the son of Abraham Joseph, a Jewish merchant. James later adopted the surname Sylvester when his older brother did so upon emigration to the United States.

At the age of 14, Sylvester was a student of Augustus De Morgan at the University of London. His family withdrew him from the University after he was accused of stabbing a fellow student with a knife. Subsequently, he attended the Liverpool Royal Institution.

Sylvester began his study of mathematics at St John's College, Cambridge in 1831, where his tutor was John Hymers. Although his studies were interrupted for almost two years due to a prolonged illness, he nevertheless ranked second in Cambridge's famous mathematical examination, the tripos, for which he sat in 1837. However, Sylvester was not issued a degree, because graduates at that time were required to state their acceptance of the Thirty-nine Articles of the Church of England, and Sylvester could not do so because he was Jewish. For the same reason, he was unable to compete for a Fellowship or obtain a Smith's prize. In 1838, Sylvester became professor of natural philosophy at University College London and in 1839 a Fellow of the Royal Society of London. In 1841, he was awarded a BA and an MA by Trinity College Dublin. In the same year he moved to the United States to become a professor of mathematics at the University of Virginia, but left after less than four months. A student who had been reading a newspaper in one of Sylvester's lectures insulted him and Sylvester struck him with a sword stick. The student collapsed in shock and Sylvester believed (wrongly) that he had killed him. Sylvester resigned when he felt that the university authorities had not sufficiently disciplined the student. He moved to New York City and began friendships with the Harvard mathematician Benjamin Peirce (father of Charles Sanders Peirce) and the Princeton physicist Joseph Henry. However, he left in November 1843 after being denied appointment as Professor of Mathematics at Columbia College (now University), again for his Judaism, and returned to England.

On his return to England, he was hired in 1844 by the Equity and Law Life Assurance Society for which he developed successful actuarial models and served as de facto CEO, a position that required a law degree. As a result, he studied for the Bar, meeting a fellow British mathematician studying law, Arthur Cayley, with whom he made significant contributions to invariant theory and also matrix theory during a long collaboration. He did not obtain a position teaching university mathematics until 1855, when he was appointed professor of mathematics at the Royal Military Academy, Woolwich, from which he retired in 1869, because the compulsory retirement age was 55. The Woolwich academy initially refused to pay Sylvester his full pension, and only relented after a prolonged public controversy, during which Sylvester took his case to the letters page of The Times.

One of Sylvester's lifelong passions was for poetry; he read and translated works from the original French, German, Italian, Latin and Greek, and many of his mathematical papers contain illustrative quotes from classical poetry. Following his early retirement, Sylvester published a book entitled The Laws of Verse in which he attempted to codify a set of laws for prosody in poetry.

In 1872, he finally received his B.A. and M.A. from Cambridge, having been denied the degrees due to his being a Jew.

In 1876 Sylvester again crossed the Atlantic Ocean to become the inaugural professor of mathematics at the new Johns Hopkins University in Baltimore, Maryland. His salary was $5,000 (quite generous for the time), which he demanded be paid in gold.  After negotiation, agreement was reached on a salary that was not paid in gold.

In 1877, he was elected as a member to the American Philosophical Society.

In 1878 he founded the American Journal of Mathematics.  The only other mathematical journal in the US at that time was the Analyst, which eventually became the Annals of Mathematics.

In 1883, he returned to England to take up the Savilian Professor of Geometry at Oxford University. He held this chair until his death, although in 1892 the University appointed a deputy professor to the same chair. He was on the governing body of Abingdon School.

Sylvester died at 5 Hertford Street, London on 15 March 1897. He is buried in Balls Pond Road Cemetery on Kingsbury Road in London.

Legacy

Sylvester invented a great number of mathematical terms such as "matrix" (in 1850), "graph" (in the sense of network) and "discriminant". He coined the term "totient" for Euler's totient function φ(n). In discrete geometry he is remembered for Sylvester's problem and a result on the orchard problem, and in matrix theory he discovered
Sylvester's determinant identity, which generalizes the Desnanot–Jacobi identity. His collected scientific work fills four volumes. In 1880, the Royal Society of London awarded Sylvester the Copley Medal, its highest award for scientific achievement; in 1901, it instituted the Sylvester Medal in his memory, to encourage mathematical research after his death in Oxford.

Sylvester House, a portion of an undergraduate dormitory at Johns Hopkins University, is named in his honor. Several professorships there are named in his honor also.

Publications

See also 
Catalecticant
Covariance and contravariance of vectors
Evectant
Inclusion–exclusion principle
Invariant of a binary form
Sylvester's construction
Sylvester pentahedron
Sylvester's problem
Clock and shift matrices
Umbral calculus
List of things named after James Joseph Sylvester

References

Sources 
.

External links 

 
 
 Collected papers – from the University of Michigan Historical Math Collection
 J. J. Sylvester home page
 Selected Poetry of James Joseph Sylvester
 

1814 births
1897 deaths
19th-century American mathematicians
19th-century English mathematicians
Academics of University College London
Linear algebraists
Alumni of St John's College, Cambridge
British actuaries
Burials at Balls Pond Road Cemetery
English Jews
Combinatorialists
Fellows of the Royal Society
Foreign associates of the National Academy of Sciences
Jewish American scientists
Johns Hopkins University faculty
Number theorists
Alumni of Trinity College Dublin
Recipients of the Copley Medal
Royal Medal winners
Savilian Professors of Geometry
Second Wranglers
De Morgan Medallists
Governors of Abingdon School
Fellows of the Royal Society of Edinburgh
Johns Hopkins University
19th-century British businesspeople